Randy Reutershan (born June 30, 1955) is a former American football player who performed in a single season in the National Football League (NFL) for the Pittsburgh Steelers. He was a member of teams that won a college football national championship and Super Bowl XIII over the Dallas Cowboys.

Early life
Reutershan was born in New York City to Warren and Doris Reutershan. He attended Mahwah High School in Mahwah, New Jersey where he earned letters three years in football, basketball and track.

Football career
Reutershan attended the University of Pittsburgh. In his junior season he was a wide receiver and special teams ace on the Panthers team which won the national championship. He had 17 catches for 311 yards in his senior season at Pitt in 1977. His tenacity as a special teams player, particularly his love of tackling on the coverage team, earned him the nickname "the Rat." His college coach, Johnny Majors called Reutershan, "the most dynamic special teams performer I have ever seen."

Reutershan was selected by the Pittsburgh Steelers in the sixth round of the 1978 NFL Draft. He made the team as a defensive back after switching back and forth from wide receiver during training camp. He played in eleven games in his rookie season, contributing primarily on special teams. His season was cut short in mid-November by a single vehicle roll-over automobile accident that left him with severe head injuries for which he was hospitalized for a full month. Although he would eventually recover from his injuries, he was advised to discontinue his professional football career.

Reutershan returned to his alma mater, Pittsburgh, as a wide receivers coach under Jackie Sherrill in 1979.

References

1955 births
Living people
American football wide receivers
Mahwah High School alumni
Pittsburgh Steelers players
Pittsburgh Panthers football players
Sportspeople from Bergen County, New Jersey
Players of American football from New York City
People from Mahwah, New Jersey